Chao Zhefu (3 December 1894 – 13 December 1970) was a Chinese educator and politician. He was born in Qingfeng County, Zhili province (now in Henan), in 1894. He served as Governor of Pingyuan Province from 1949 to 1952. After Pingyuan was abolished in 1952, he became Vice-Governor of Shandong Province in 1953. He served as the president of Shandong University in Qingdao from 1956 to 1958. He died in Jinan in 1970.

References

1894 births
1970 deaths
Presidents of Shandong University
Political office-holders in Shandong
Vice-governors of Shandong